Aeneas Fleeing Troy or The Flight From Troy is a c. 1640-1645 oil on canvas painting by Mattia Preti, now in the Galleria nazionale di arte antica in Palazzo Barberini in Rome. It shows Aeneas carrying his father Anchises and being led by his young son Ascanius as told in Book 2 of the Aeneid. It first appears in the written record in an 1824 inventory of Giovanni Torlonia's collections, which misattributed it to Simon Vouet, with later inventories misattributing it to Alessandro Turchi and the correct attribution only restored in 1916 by Roberto Longhi.

References

1640s paintings
Collections of the Galleria Nazionale d'Arte Antica
Paintings by Mattia Preti
Paintings based on the Aeneid